Streptopyrrole is an antibiotic with the molecular formula C14H12ClNO4 which is produced by the bacterium Streptomyces armeniacus

References 

antibiotics
Benzoxazines
Chloroarenes